Napier is a locality in the Riverina district of New South Wales, Australia and also a civil parish of Buccleuch County, New South Wales.

Napier was the site of a now-closed railway station between 1911 and 1967 on the Oaklands railway line. No trace of the station now remains.

The Napier Football Club (Australian Rules Football) were the premiers of the Lockhart & District Football Association in 1911.

References

Towns in the Riverina
Towns in New South Wales
Parishes of Buccleuch County
Localities in New South Wales
Geography of New South Wales